Luke Cornish (born 1979) is an Australian stencil artist, also known as E.L.K. In 2012 Cornish became the first stencil artist to become a finalist in the Archibald Prize. He was also awarded the Holding Redlich People's Choice Award at the Archibald Prize Salon des Refusés in 2017, the Churchill Fellowship in 2013 and was a finalist in the Sulman prize in the same year. In 2011, he was a finalist in the Metro Art Prize, won the Australian Stencil Art prize in 2010, and in 2008 he won the most popular stencil at Melbourne Stencil Festival. In 2012, Cornish's short film, 'Me- We', which documented the process and construction of his portrait of Father Bob Maguire for entry into the 2012 Archibald Prize, was shortlisted in the Tropfest Awards Film Festival. Other notable achievements include being selected for 2012's Project 5 charity auction, a large involvement in 2011's Outpost Project. Cornish has exhibited his work in capital and regional cities in Australia, and in major international cultural centres, including Paris, London, Rome, Los Angeles and Amsterdam.

Career

Growing up in Canberra, Cornish worked as a sign writer and landscape designer before taking up stencil art as a hobby in the early-2000s. All of his work is done by hand through cutting out sheets of recycled acetate with a scalpel. Some of Cornish's stencils contain over 100 layers and up to 243 colours. The subject of his 2012 Archibald final work, Father Bob Maguire, contains over 30 layers and the work was influenced by Cornish's association of Maguire with his own grandfather. Being an atheist, religious iconography occurs frequently in his work. Cornish's portrait of the controversial Catholic priest achieved a new auction record for a work by an Australian street artist selling for A$34,160 during the Bonhams Australia Important Australian Art auction in late 2013.

Cornish has made multiple visits to Syria, Lebanon and Iran.  In early 2017 he co-founded the 'For Syrias Children' Charity organisation, which works in conjunction with Non-Government Organisations on the ground in Syria, raising funds for Syrian children affected by conflict. In 2017 Cornish curated an urban art auction to raise funds for the children of Syria.

Cornish currently lives and works in Sydney. His work is held in public and private collections around the world, most notably his portrait of former Australian Prime Minister Bob Hawke, which was acquired by the National Portrait Gallery of Australia in 2013.

Exhibition history (solo shows) 
2018: No place like home, Tuggeranong art centre, Canberra
2017: Zero to the left, Metro Gallery, Melbourne
2017: Road to Damascus, Nanda\Hobbs Contemporary, Sydney
2016: Vanishing Point, Nanda\Hobbs Contemporary, Sydney
2016: Concrete Jungle, Metro Gallery, Melbourne
2014: Louder than words, Stolen Space, London
2014: Clusterfuck, Metro Gallery, Melbourne
2014: Sex & Death, w/ Will Coles, Art Equity, Sydney
2013: Before Afghanistan, Art Equity, Sydney
2012: Not with it..., Metro Gallery, Melbourne
2011: Look what you made me do...., Brunswick Street Gallery, Melbourne
2011: This is why we can't have nice things..., Oh really Gallery, Newtown, Sydney
2010: How you like me now Bitch?, Front Gallery, Canberra

Awards and collections 
2019: Archibald Prize, Finalist
2018: Salon de Refusés, SH Ervine Gallery, Sydney
2017: Salon de Refusés, SH Ervine Gallery, Sydney (Winner: Holding Redlich People's Choice Award)
2016: Australian War Memorial, Canberra (acquisition)
2015: Gold Coast Art Gallery, QLD (acquisition)
2014: Bond University Collection, QLD
2014: Corrigan Collection 
2013: Churchill Fellowship, Awardee
2013: National Portrait Gallery, Canberra (acquisition)
2013: Sulman prize, Finalist
2012: Moran Portrait prize, semi-finalist
2012: Archibald prize, Finalist
2012: Tropfest, shortlisted
2011: Metro Art Prize, Finalist
2010: Australian Stencil Art Prize, Winner
2009: Ballarat Gallery of Modern Art (acquisition)
2009: Australian Stencil art prize, Runner up
2008: Melbourne Stencil Festival, Peoples choice

References

External links 
 
 

1979 births
Australian graffiti artists
Living people
Archibald Prize Salon des Refusés People's Choice Award winners
Archibald Prize Salon des Refusés
Archibald Prize finalists
Artists from the Australian Capital Territory